Coleophora bajkalella is a moth of the family Coleophoridae. It is found in eastern Siberia.

References

bajkalella
Moths described in 1993
Moths of Asia